Marcos Baghdatis won the title, beating Mikhail Kukushkin 7–6(9–7), 6–4

Seeds

Draw

Finals

Top half

Bottom half

References 
 Main draw
 Qualifying draw

Comerica Bank Challenger - Men's Singles
2014 Men's Singles